Adam is a 2019 Moroccan drama film directed by Maryam Touzani. It was screened in the Un Certain Regard section at the 2019 Cannes Film Festival. It was selected as the Moroccan entry for the Best International Feature Film at the 92nd Academy Awards, but it was not nominated.

Plot
The film focuses on Samia, a young unwed pregnant mother who goes looking for work and is taken in by a widowed baker, Abla. The film was inspired by a similar situation Touzani experienced where her parents sheltered a heavily pregnant woman in Tangier for several days during a time when being an unwed pregnant woman was illegal in Morocco.

Cast
 Lubna Azabal as Abla
 Nissrine Erradi as Samia
 Douae Belkhaouda as Warda
 Aziz Hattab as Slimani
 Hasnaa Tamtaoui as Rkia

Reception

See also
 List of submissions to the 92nd Academy Awards for Best International Feature Film
 List of Moroccan submissions for the Academy Award for Best International Feature Film

References

External links
 

2019 films
2019 drama films
Moroccan drama films
2010s Arabic-language films